SliderDock is a freeware application launcher for Microsoft Windows that uses a wheel-like interface to organize icons. When the user scrolls with the mouse wheel, the icons rotate towards a fixed point so the user can access a specific icon. The SliderDock application can be minimized to a background process, which it utilizes to reduce RAM cost. Like many other docks, it can be customized with skins and icons from other docks.

References

 review @ pcworld.com
 review @ downloadTube.com
 review @ soft82.com

External links
 SliderDock website

Application launchers
Windows-only software
Windows-only freeware